"Oh Yeah" (occasionally spelt as "Oh Yea") is a song by Northern Irish rock band Ash, released as the fifth single from their debut studio album, 1977 (1996), on 24 June 1996. It was released on CD, 7-inch vinyl, and cassette formats. Upon its release, "Oh Yeah" debuted and peaked at number six on the UK Singles Chart, becoming Ash's second-highest-charting single on the chart following their previous release, "Goldfinger".

Overview
"Oh Yeah" was the first single released after the release of 1977 and was Ash's second top-10 single, reaching number six on the UK Singles Chart. The song features backing vocals from singer Lisa Moorish.

Track listings
UK, European, and Australian CD single
 "Oh Yeah" (Tim Wheeler)
 "T. Rex" (Wheeler)
 "Everywhere Is All Around" (Wheeler, Martin Carr)
 "Does Your Mother Know" (Benny Andersson, Björn Ulvaeus)

UK 7-inch yellow vinyl single and cassette single
 "Oh Yeah" (Wheeler)
 "T. Rex" (Wheeler)
 "Everywhere Is All Around" (Wheeler, Carr)
 "Oh Yeah" (quartet version) (Wheeler)

Charts

References

1996 singles
1996 songs
Ash (band) songs
Infectious Records singles
Songs written by Tim Wheeler